The academic dress of the former University of Wales was designed for the first graduations in 1893, and has as its main identifying feature a faculty colour scheme involving 'shot silks'.

Although the University of Wales no longer exists in its former guise, the University of Wales, Trinity Saint David nonetheless uses its academic dress scheme.

Gowns 

Undergraduates wear a gown of black stuff, in the Oxford scholar's shape.

Bachelors, holders of advanced first degrees (such as the MChem, MMath, etc.) and holders of foundation degrees or undergraduate diplomas wear a black stuff or silk gown of the Oxford BA shape, but with the forearm seam divided for 4" and the two flaps turned back and held in place with two buttons; between the flaps is a short length of black ribbon, held by a third button. This is said to represent the Prince of Wales's feathers.

Masters (except holders of advanced first degrees) wear a black stuff or silk gown of the Oxford MA shape with inverted-T armholes and the lower point of the sleeve boot replaced by a right angle. For more information on the classification of academic dress, see the Groves classification system.

Doctors in undress wear the masters' gown.

In full dress, Doctors of Philosophy (PhD), Engineering (EngD), Nursing Science (DNursSc), Clinical Psychology (DClinPsy), Educational Psychology (DEdPsy) and Ministry (DMin) wear a crimson cloth gown of the Cambridge doctors' shape, with facings and sleeve linings of the appropriate faculty silk.

In full dress, higher doctors (DD, LLD, MD, DMus, DLitt, DSc, DScEcon and DChD) wear a scarlet cloth gown of the Cambridge doctors' shape, with facings and sleeve linings of the relevant faculty silk.

Hoods 

Holders of foundation degrees and certain diplomas wear a black hood bound with a twisted cord of blue, crimson and gold

Bachelors wear a hood of black stuff or silk in a modified Oxford simple shape, partly lined with 3" of silk in the relevant faculty colour (see below).  The exceptions to this rule are the MB BCh and BDS (which are fully lined) and the BMus (which is made of dark blue stuff or silk).

Masters (including holders of advanced first degrees) wear a hood of black corded silk in the Cambridge full shape, fully lined with silk in the appropriate faculty colour (see below).  The exceptions are the MMus (whose hood is made of dark blue corded silk) and the MRes and MPhil (who wear the same hood as prescribed for the corresponding taught master's degree, with an additional crimson binding in the case of the MPhil).

Doctors wear a hood of crimson (in the case of the PhD, EngD, DNursSc, DClinPsy, DEdPsy and DMin) or scarlet (in the case of the higher doctorates DD, LLD, MD, DMus, DLitt, DSc, DScEcon and DChD) cloth, lined and bound in the relevant faculty colour silk.

Hats 

Undergraduates, holders of diplomas or foundation degrees, bachelors and masters, as well as doctors in undress, wear a black cloth mortar board.

Doctors in full dress wear a black velvet mortar board.

Faculty silks 

The University of Wales has adopted a faculty colour scheme making wide use of shot silks, first proposed by Lady Verney.  The faculty colours are as follows.

See also 

 Academic dress of the University of Wales, Lampeter

References 

 Shaw, George W. (1995), Academical Dress of British and Irish Universities. Chicester: Philmore & Co. Ltd.

External links 
 University of Wales: University gowns and hoods

Wales
University of Wales